The Historic Indian Agency House is located in Portage, Wisconsin. It was added to the National Register of Historic Places in 1972. The house is located near the Portage Canal.

History

The house was built by the Federal government of the United States to be a residence for John H. Kinzie, who was serving as an Indian Sub-agent to the Ho-Chunk, and his wife, Juliette Augusta Magill Kinzie. Juliette later wrote a book about the couple's experiences during this time entitled 'Wau-Bun, the "Early Day" in the Northwest'. The house, one of the oldest in Wisconsin, now serves as a museum. Artifacts and displays include items about Native American culture. It is owned by The National Society of the Colonial Dames of America in the State of Wisconsin.

See also
List of the oldest buildings in Wisconsin

References

External links
 Historic Indian Agency House - official site

Houses on the National Register of Historic Places in Wisconsin
Government buildings on the National Register of Historic Places in Wisconsin
Native American museums in Wisconsin
Historic house museums in Wisconsin
Museums in Columbia County, Wisconsin
Federal architecture in Wisconsin
Houses completed in 1832
Houses in Columbia County, Wisconsin
Portage, Wisconsin
National Society of the Colonial Dames of America
National Register of Historic Places in Columbia County, Wisconsin
1832 establishments in Michigan Territory